Rhinoclemmys is a genus of turtles in the family Geoemydidae (formerly Bataguridae), the only genus in the subfamily Rhinoclemmydinae. Member species of the genus are commonly known as the Neotropical wood turtles and are the only geoemydids known from the Americas. As such, they have adapted to a wide range of habitats, which is reflected in the species' common names.

Species 
The genus Rhinoclemmys contains the following extant and fossil species which are recognized as being valid:
 R. annulata  – brown wood turtle
 R. areolata  – furrowed wood turtle
 R. diademata  – Maracaibo wood turtle
 R. funerea  – black river turtle
 R. melanosterna  – Colombian wood turtle
 R. nasuta  – large-nosed wood turtle
 R. pulcherrima  – painted wood turtle
 R. punctularia  – spot-legged wood turtle
 R. rubida  – Mexican spotted wood turtle
 †R. panamaensis  - Hemingfordian - Cucaracha Formation, Panama

Nota bene: A binomial authority in parentheses indicates that the species was originally described in a genus other than Rhinoclemmys.

References

Bibliography

Further reading 

 
 Fitzinger L (1835). "Entwurf einer systematischen Anordnung der Schildkröten nach den Grundsätzen der natürlichen Methode ". Annalen des Wiener Museums der Naturgeschichte 1: 105–128. (Rhinoclemmys, new genus, p. 115). (in German and Latin).

 
Turtle genera
Extant Miocene first appearances
Turtles of North America
Turtles of South America
Reptiles described in 1835
Taxa named by Leopold Fitzinger
Taxonomy articles created by Polbot